Richard Charles Field (5 November 1866 – 26 January 1961) was an Australian politician.

He was born in Westbury in Tasmania, the son of Thomas Field. In 1909 he was elected to the Tasmanian House of Assembly as an Anti-Socialist member for Wilmot. He was defeated in 1912. Field died in Launceston in 1961.

References

1866 births
1961 deaths
Free Trade Party politicians
Members of the Tasmanian House of Assembly